Jaroslav Hrbáček (12 May 1921, in Brno – 16 July 2010, in Prague) was a Czech academic and zoologist.

References

1921 births
2010 deaths
Czech zoologists
Scientists from Brno
Czechoslovak scientists